The 2018 Pac-12 Conference men's soccer season was the 19th season of men's varsity soccer in the conference. The season began on August 24, 2018 and concluded on November 9, 2018.

The four-time defending champions, Stanford, successfully defended their Pac-12 title. The Cardinal entered the NCAA Tournament as the three-time defending champions, but were eliminated by Akron in the quarterfinals. Joining Stanford in the tournament were Oregon State, Washington, and UCLA.

Teams

Head coaches 

 AC = Assistant coach

Stadiums and locations 

 Arizona, Arizona State, Colorado, Oregon, USC, Utah, and Washington State sponsor men's soccer at the club level and thus do not compete in the Pac-12 Conference. San Diego State is an associate member.

Preseason

Recruiting

Preseason poll 
The preseason poll will be released in August 2018.

Preseason matches

Regular season 

All times Pacific time.

Week 1 (Aug. 20-26)

Week 2 (Aug. 27-Sep. 2)

Week 3 (Sep. 3-9)

Week 4 (Sep. 10-16)

Week 5 (Sep. 17-23)

Week 6 (Sep. 24-30)

Week 7 (Oct. 1-7)

Week 8 (Oct. 8-14)

Week 9 (Oct. 15-21)

Week 10 (Oct. 22-28)

Week 11 (Oct. 29-Nov. 4)

Week 12 (Nov. 5-Nov. 11)

Rankings

National rankings

USC Far West regional

Postseason

NCAA Tournament

Player statistics

Goals

Assists

Awards and honors

Player of the week honors

Following each week's games, Pac-12 conference officials select the player of the week.

Postseason awards 

All-Pac-12 First, Second, and Third Teams

MLS SuperDraft

Draft picks

Homegrown contracts

See also 
 2018 NCAA Division I men's soccer season
 2018 Pac-12 Conference women's soccer season

References 

 
2018 NCAA Division I men's soccer season